3-Aminoacridine is an aminoacridine.

See also
 2-Aminoacridine
 4-Aminoacridine
 9-Aminoacridine

 

Aromatic amines
Acridines